Heinrich Max Runge (21 September 1849, in Stettin – 27 July 1909, in Göttingen) was a German obstetrician and gynecologist.

He studied medicine at the universities of Jena, Leipzig, Bonn and Strasbourg, where in 1875 he received his doctorate. In 1879 he obtained his habilitation at Berlin under the sponsorship of Adolf Gusserow. In 1883 he became a professor of obstetrics and gynecology at the University of Dorpat, and five years later relocated as a professor to Göttingen, where on three occasions he served as dean at the university.

He was the author of influential textbooks on both obstetrics and gynecology. The focus of his research included hot water therapy for uterine atony, treatment of puerperal fever, fetal disease, umbilical infections and laparotomy.

Selected works 
 Die Krankheiten der ersten Lebenstage, 1885 – Diseases of the first days of life.
 Lehrbuch der Geburtshülfe, 1891 – Textbook of obstetrics
 Lehrbuch der Gynäkologie, 1902 – Textbook of gynecology.

References 

1849 births
1909 deaths
Physicians from Szczecin
Academic staff of the University of Göttingen
Academic staff of the University of Tartu
University of Strasbourg alumni
German gynaecologists
German obstetricians